The FKF Women's Division One is the second tier women's football league in the Kenyan football league system. It is controlled by the Football Kenya Federation.

2